Hans Mackowsky (19 November 1871, Berlin – 18 July 1938, Potsdam) was a German art historian.

Hans Mackowsky studied art history in Berlin and Freiburg, receiving his doctorate in 1893 at Berlin. From 1896 to 1900 he was a research assistant at the Gemäldegalerie, Berlin. He then studied in Florence for two years, later becoming a private scholar in Berlin. From 1905 Mackowsky wrote for the art magazine Kunst und Künstler published by Bruno Cassirer. From 1908 he was a lecturer at the Humboldt-Akademie (Humboldt Academy), and the privately run Lessing-Hochschule (Lessing University) in Berlin. In 1909 he became a professor, and in 1912 director of the Christian Daniel Rauch Museum, part of the National Gallery of Berlin, on Klosterstrasse, and from the early 1930s in the Orangery wing of Charlottenburg Palace In 1914 he became assistant director at the National Gallery, and from 1916 worked there as curator. The life work of the sculptor Johann Gottfried Schadow formed the focus of his research. Mackowsky made a name for himself as the author and editor of books on important artists from the 18th to the 20th century, and as a museum guide.

Karl Scheffler wrote about Mackowsky in his memoirs in 1946:

Hermann von Wedderkop described Hans Mackowsky as the best connoisseur of little known Berlin and dedicated his book Das unbekannte Berlin (The Unknown Berlin) to him. Franz Hessel paid tribute to Mackowsky in his book Spazieren in Berlin (Walking in Berlin):

Mackowsky became a victim of the Nuremberg Laws during the Nazi era because of his parentage. Wolf Jobst Siedler recalled in 2004 that he "met a sad and lonely end in 1938 because he was a Jew". Hans Mackowsky died at Potsdam on 18 July 1938 and was buried in Bornstedter Cemetery. Mackowsky's widow, Else who lived until 1950, published new editions of his books after his death.

Selected publications
 Die Bildwerke Gottfried Schadows, with an introduction by Paul Ortwin Rave, Deutscher Verein für Kunstwissenschaft, Berlin 1951
 Schadows Graphik in Forschungen zur deutschen Kunstgeschichte, band 19, Deutscher Verein für Kunstwissenschaft, Berlin 1936.
 Michelangelo, Stammtafeln, Quellen und Literatur sowie Register, appendices "verschollene, zweifelhafte and unechte Arbeiten" Cassirer, Berlin 1931
 Johann Gottfried Schadow. Jugend und Aufstieg 1764 bis 1797, Grote, Berlin 1927
 Häuser und Menschen im alten Berlin, Cassirer, Berlin 1923
 Adolph Menzel. Die Soldaten Friedrichs des Großen. introduced and explained by Hans Mackowsky. Seemann, Leipzig 1923
 Karl Friedrich Schinkel. Briefe, Tagebücher, Gedanken, selected, introduced and explained by Hans Mackowsky, Propyläen, Berlin 1922
 Im Abendrot. Gedichte, Eduard Stichnote, Potsdam, 1920
 Das schöne Buch im alten Berlin, in Almanach des Verlages Bruno Cassirer, Berlin 1920
 reprint Das schöne Buch im alten Berlin, Freundesgabe für die Mitglieder des Berliner Bibliophilen Abends, Berlin 1994
Das Alt-Berliner Grabmal 1750 bis 1850. Hundert Aufnahmen und Vermessungen – kunstgeschichtlich eingeleitet von Hans Mackowsky with Wolfgang Schütz, Cassirer, Berlin 1918
 Christian Daniel Rauch: 1777 to 1857. Cassirer, Berlin 1916
reprint Propyläen, Frankfurt, Berlin, Vienna 1981 
 Michelangniolo, Marquardt, Berlin 1908, and Cassirer 1919, 1921
 and Cassirer 1925, 1931 under title Michelangelo
 and Metzler 1939, 1941, 1947, 1951
Adolph Bayersdorfers Leben und Schriften. Aus seinem Nachlass herausgegeben, ed. August Pauly and Wilhelm Weigand, Bruckmann, Munich 1902
 Verrocchio, Velhagen & Klasing, Bielefeld and Leipzig 1901.

References

External links

1871 births
1938 deaths
People from Berlin
19th-century German historians
20th-century German historians
German art historians